Anna Kim (born 10 September 1977) is an Austrian writer.

Life 
Kim was born in Daejeon, South Korea in 1977 but moved to Germany in 1979. She studied at the University of Vienna in philosophy and theatre studies, graduating with a master's degree.

Since 1999 she has regularly published in newspapers, magazines and anthologies.

In 2012, Kim was Austria's winner of the European Union Prize for Literature for her second novel, Die gefrorene Zeit (translated in English as Frozen Time). Published in 2008, the novel covers the Kosovar man searching for his missing wife after the end of the Yugoslav wars.

Kim lives in Vienna.

Awards 
Kim has received numerous awards and grants:

 2009: HALMA Scholarship
 2009: Elias Canetti Scholarship
 2009: Heinrich Treichl Prize from the Austrian Red Cross
 2010: Robert Musil Scholarship
 2012: European Union Prize for Literature for Die gefrorene Zeit (Frozen Time)
 2017: Artist in Residence at Villa Sträuli in Winterthur

Selected works 
 Die Bilderspur (The Trace of Pictures, 2004) – novel 
Das Sinken ein Bückflug (2006) – poetry collection
Die gefrorene Zeit (Frozen Time, 2008) – novel 
 Anatomie einer Nacht (Anatomy of a Night, 2012) – novel

References 

Austrian women writers
University of Vienna alumni
1977 births
Living people